The ICSA Team Racing National Championship is one of the seven Inter-Collegiate Sailing Association National Championships. Between 1972 and 2009 it was the Sloop Championship, but changed name in 2010 when the racing format was changed to match racing.  

Winners are awarded the Cornelius Shields Sr. Trophy.

Champions

References

External links 
CORNELIUS SHIELDS SR. TROPHY

ICSA championships